O'Donovan is an Irish family name.

It may refer to :
O'Donovan (surname), surname
O'Donovan family, a patronymic surname that derives from Irish Ó Donnabháin, meaning the grandsons or descendants of Donnubán
O'Donovan Rossa (Skibbereen) GAA, O'Donovan Rossa or Skibbereen, a Gaelic football and hurling club based in Skibbereen, County Cork, Ireland.
O'Donovan Rossa GAC Belfast,  Gaelic Athletic Association club based in Belfast, County Antrim.

See also 
Donovan (disambiguation)